Albertine Gnanazan Hépié is a politician from Ivory Coast. She served as Minister for the Family and the Promotion of Women from 1993 to 1998.

References

Year of birth missing (living people)
Living people
Women government ministers of Ivory Coast
Government ministers of Ivory Coast
Place of birth missing (living people)
20th-century Ivorian women politicians
20th-century Ivorian politicians